Glavaš (Serbian Cyrillic: Главаш) is a Serbian and Croatian family name.

People with the surname include:
 Luka Glavas (1985), Australian-born footballer
 Branimir Glavaš (1956), Croatian former major general and politician
 Marin Glavaš (born 1992), Croatian footballer
 Radoslav Glavaš (senior) (1863-1913), Herzegovinian Croat Franciscan
 Radoslav Glavaš (junior) (1909-1945), Herzegovinian Croat Franciscan
 Stanoje Glavaš (1763-1815), Serbian hajduk and hero
 Vlatko Glavaš (1962), Bosnian footballer

Croatian surnames
Serbian surnames